Ophichthus naga, the deepwater demonic snake eel, is an eel in the family Ophichthidae (worm/snake eels). It was collected off Myanmar.

Etymology
The name Nāga, means a seagoing, serpentine dragon-like being in the Buddhist religion that has great powers and are able to swim through the solid earth as if it was water, a behavior not unlike that of ophichthid snake eels.

References

naga
Taxa named by John E. McCosker
Taxa named by Peter Nick Psomadakis
Fish described in 2018